Alagyaz may refer to:
Alagyaz, Armenia
Aragats, Talin, Armenia
Artabuynk, Armenia
Mount Aragats, Armenia
Yeghegis, Armenia

See also 
 Aragats (disambiguation)